Jeffery Lee Carlson (born July 20, 1953 in Virginia, Minnesota) is a retired American ice hockey forward.

Career
Carlson is best known for his role in the movie Slap Shot as one of the Hanson Brothers.  Carlson also played in the World Hockey Association with the Minnesota Fighting Saints.   Carlson is now an electrician in Muskegon, Michigan.

Regular season

References

External links

1953 births
American men's ice hockey right wingers
Greensboro Generals (SHL) players
Hampton Gulls (SHL) players
Johnstown Jets players
Living people
Minnesota Fighting Saints players
People from Virginia, Minnesota
Ice hockey players from Minnesota